Web GIS (also known as Web-Based GIS), or Web Geographic Information Systems , are GIS that employ the World Wide Web to facilitate the storage, visualization, analysis, and distribution of spatial information over the Internet.

Introduction
The World Wide Web, or the Web, is an information system that uses the internet to host, share, and distribute documents, images, and other data. Web GIS involves using the World Wide Web to facilitate GIS tasks traditionally done on a desktop computer, as well as enabling the sharing of maps and spatial data. While Web GIS and Internet GIS are sometimes used interchangeably, they are different concepts. Web GIS is a subset of Internet GIS, which is itself a subset of distributed GIS, which itself is a subset of broader Geographic information system. The most common application of Web GIS is Web mapping, so much so that the two terms are often used interchangeably in much the same way as Digital mapping and GIS. However, Web GIS and web mapping are distinct concepts, with web mapping not necessarily requiring a Web GIS.

The use of the Web has dramatically increased the effectiveness of both accessing and distributing spatial data, two of the most significant challenges of desktop GIS. Many functions, such as interactivity, and dynamic scaling, are made widely available to end users by web services. Due to the scale of the Web can sometimes make finding quality and reliable data a challenge for GIS professionals, and end users, with a significant amount of low-quality, poorly organized, or poorly sourced material available for public consumption. This can make finding spatial data a time consuming activity for GIS users.

History
The history of Web GIS is very closely tied to the history of geographic information systems, Digital mapping, and the World Wide Web or the Web. The Web was first created in 1990, and the first major web mapping program capable of distributed map creation appeared shortly after in 1993. This software, named PARC Map Viewer, was unique in that it facilitated dynamic user map generation, rather than static images. This software also allowed users to employ GIS without having it locally installed on their machine. The US federal government made the TIGER Mapping Service available to the public in 1995, which facilitated desktop and Web GIS by hosting US boundary data. In 1996, MapQuest became available to the public, facilitating navigation and trip planning.

In 1997, Esri began to focus on their desktop GIS software, which in 2000 became ArcGIS. This led to Esri dominating the GIS industry for the next several years. In 2000 Esri launched the Geography Network, which offered some web GIS functions. In 2014, ArcGIS Online replaced this, and offers significant Web GIS functions including hosting, manipulating, and visualizing data in dynamic applications.

Applications

Web GIS has numerous applications and functions, and is used to manage most distributed spatial information. These functions can be divided into categories of Geospatial web services including  web feature services, web processing services, and web mapping services. Geospatial web services are distinct software packages available on the World Wide Web that can be employed to perform a function with spatial data.

Web feature services

Web feature services allow users to access, edit, and make use of hosted geospatial feature datasets.

Web processing services

Web processing services allow users to perform GIS calculations on spatial data. Web processing services standardize inputs, and outputs, for spatial data within an internet GIS and may have standardized algorithms for spatial statistics.

Web mapping services

Web mapping involves using distributed tools to create and host both static and dynamic maps. It is different than desktop digital mapping in that the data, software, or both might not be stored locally and are often distributed across many computers. Web mapping allows for the rapid distribution of spatial visualizations without the need for printing. They also facilitates rapid updating to reflect new datasets and allow for interactive datasets that would be impossible in print media. Web mapping was employed extensively during the COVID-19 pandemic to visualize the datasets in close to real-time.

Web coverage services

Web Map Tile Service

Open Geospatial Consortium

Geospatial Semantic Web

The Geospatial Semantic Web is a vision to include geospatial information at the core of the Semantic Web to facilitate information retrieval and information integration. This vision requires the definition of geospatial ontologies, semantic gazetteers, and shared technical vocabularies to describe geographic phenomena. The Semantic Geospatial Web is part of geographic information science.

Criticism
All maps are simplifications of reality and, therefore, can never be perfectly accureate. These inaccuracies include distortions introduced during projection, simplifications, and human error. While traditionally trained ethical cartographers try to minimize these errors and document the known sources of error, including where the data originated, Web GIS facilitates the creation of maps by non-traditionally trained cartographers and, more significantly, facilitates the rapid dissemination of their potentially erroneous maps. While this democratization of GIS has many potential positives, including empowering traditionally disenfranchised groups of people, it also means that a wide audience can see bad maps. Further, malicious actors can quickly spread intentionally misleading spatial information while hiding the source. This has significant implications, and contributes to the infodemic surrounding many topics, including the spread of potentially misleading information on the COVID-19 pandemic.

Due to the nature of the Web, using it for storing and computation is less secure than using local networks. When working with sensitive data, Web GIS may expose an organization to the additional risk of having its data breached then if they use dedicated hardware and a Virtual Private Network to access that hardware remotely over the internet. The convenience and relatively low cost of Web GIS often prevents this from being implemented.

See also 

 AM/FM/GIS
 At-location mapping
 Automotive navigation system
 Comparison of GIS software
 Concepts and Techniques in Modern Geography
 CyberGIS
 Digital geologic mapping
 Distributed GIS
 GIS Day
 Integrated Geo Systems
 List of GIS data sources
 List of GIS software
 Map database management
 Participatory GIS
 Quantitative geography
 Spatial neural network
 Technical geography
 Tobler's first law of geography
 Tobler's second law of geography
 Traditional knowledge GIS

References

Web Geographic information systems
Web technology